'''Jack Welch is an American football coach.Coaching career
Kansas Wesleyan
Welch was the 17th head football coach at Kansas Wesleyan University in Salina, Kansas serving for two seasons, from 1985 to 1986, and compiling a record of 8–12.

The results Welch produced at Kansas Wesleyan were considered a "turnaround" because the year before his arrival, the team had winless season. At the time, the program had the nations's longest losing streak in NAIA football.

Welch is one of the winningest Texas High School Coaches in history with 195 victories.

Other coaching positions
Welch's coaching career also includes stops at Texas A&M University-Commerce, Louisiana Tech University, West Texas A&M University, Fort Scott Community College. 

Welch is known nationally for his recruiting and special teams, and his collegiate offensive units were highly ranked every season. He was hired in 2019 as the Special Teams Coordinator and Running Back Coach at Texas A&M University-Commerce.
Welch retired in 2018 from his positions as the athletic director and head football coach for Copperas Cove High School in Copperas Cove, Texas. He had record of 193—84—1 at Copperas Cove since his 1994 debut. Welch's accomplishments also include 18 berths in the state playoffs and two appearances in the Texas 4A State Championship. Welch led the Bulldawgs to 8 district, 10 bi-district, 5 area, 4 regional, 3 quarterfinal, and 2 state semi-final championships.  Welch has the most wins of any head coach in Copperas Cove history with victories over many of Texas' most notorious 5A and 6A power houses including Odessa Permian, Converse Judson and Southlake Carroll.  Welch was Class 6A "Coach of the Year" in 1998 and has been the District "Coach of the Year" eight times.  He coached over 300 players at Copperas Cove who signed college scholarships and 15 players who made it to the professional ranks, 13 National Football League (NFL), including Heisman Trophy winner Robert Griffin III and Charles Tillman, 1 to the CFL and 1 to the XFL.  He is one of the top 100 coaches in wins in Texas history of high school football.Musician: In addition to coaching, Welch is known as a prolific drummer. At the age of 14, Welch made his first record with the Kansas group "The Penny Arcade."  Later he recorded with the "Paul Shoemaker Band," scoring a regional hit.  He played with national stars Mark Farner of Grand Funk Railroad, Kansas, David Frizzell, Percy Sledge, Archie Bell, Dennis Yost of the Classics Four, Neal Sharp of The Drifters and many others. He had numerous charted regional and national hits with his band, The Chainlink Band-including the remake of #1 hit Hey Paula. His son Steven, played guitar on many of his recordings and was a recording engineer, while his brother Gary handled bookings and, record promotions.FNL Movie''':  In the movie Friday Night Lights, Welch is portrayed by Rutherford Cravens as a Kansas Wesleyan recruiter.  Welch was the Head Coach at KWU.  His top running back was Odessa Permian transfer (from West Texas State University) Johnny Johnson III, cousin to Boobie Miles. Welch heavily recruited Texas during his tenure.

Education
Welch earned a bachelor's degree from Taylor University in Indiana, a master's degree from West Texas A&M University, and a doctorate from the University of Mary Hardin–Baylor.

Head coaching record

College

Junior college

References

Year of birth missing (living people)
Living people
Fort Scott Greyhounds football coaches
Kansas Wesleyan Coyotes football coaches
Louisiana Tech Bulldogs football coaches
West Texas A&M Buffaloes football coaches
High school football coaches in Texas
Taylor University alumni
University of Mary Hardin–Baylor alumni
West Texas A&M University alumni